Samuel J. Foote (April 23, 1873 – December 8, 1936) was a lawyer and political figure in Newfoundland. He represented Burin from 1919 to 1924 and from 1932 to 1934 in the Newfoundland and Labrador House of Assembly.

He was born in Grand Bank and was educated there, in St. John's, at Frazee Business College in Halifax, at Mount Allison University and at Dalhousie University. He articled in law and was called to the Nova Scotia bar in 1899 and then was called to the Newfoundland bar, entering practice with James A. Winter. Foote ran unsuccessfully for a seat in the Newfoundland assembly in 1904. He served in the Executive Council as a minister without portfolio. Foote and three other cabinet members resigned from cabinet in 1923 after Richard Squires refused to remove Alexander Campbell, who had been accused of misuse of government funds, from the Executive Council. He later served again as a minister without portfolio in the government of William Warren. He was defeated when he ran for election to the assembly for Burin West in 1928 but then was elected again in 1932.

Foote helped found Bell Island Tramways, later serving as a director for the company, and also played a role in establishing a pulp and paper mill at Corner Brook.

Foote died in Buffalo, New York at the age of 53.

References 

Members of the Executive Council of Newfoundland and Labrador
1873 births
1936 deaths
People from Grand Bank
Dominion of Newfoundland politicians